Acme Township is a township in Hettinger County, North Dakota, United States. Its population during the 2000 Census was 37.

References

Townships in Hettinger County, North Dakota
Townships in North Dakota